The Sheriff Principal of Tayside, Central and Fife is the head of the judicial system of the sheriffdom of Tayside, Central and Fife, one of the six sheriffdoms covering the whole of Scotland. The sheriffdom employs a number of legally qualified sheriffs who are responsible for the hearing of cases in eight Sheriffs Courts held in Alloa, Dundee, Dunfermline, Falkirk, Forfar, Kirkcaldy, Perth, and Stirling. The current Scottish sheriffdoms were created in 1975 when the previous arrangement of 12 sheriffdoms was discontinued.

The Sheriff Principal, usually a King's Counsel (KC), is appointed by the King on the recommendation of the First Minister, who receives recommendations from the Judicial Appointments Board for Scotland. They must have been qualified as an advocate or solicitor for at least ten years and are responsible for the administrative oversight of the judicial system within the sheriffdom. 
The Sheriff Principal will also hear appeals against the judgement of their Sheriffs, hear certain cases themself and occasionally conduct major fatal accident inquiries.

Sheriffs Principal of Tayside, Central and Fife
1975–?1983: Robert Richardson Taylor 
1983–1990: Edward F. Bowen QC 
1990–1998: John J. Maguire 
1998–2000: John Wheatley QC
2000–2015: Alastair Dunlop 
2015–present: Marysia W. Lewis

See also
 Historical development of Scottish sheriffdoms

References

sheriff
1975 establishments in Scotland